Adim ol Mesal (also Romanized as ‘Adīm ol Mes̄āl; also known as ‘Adīm ol Maşşl) is a village in Rud Ab-e Gharbi Rural District, Rud Ab District, Narmashir County, Kerman Province, Iran. At the 2006 census, its population was 72, in 19 families.

References 

Populated places in Narmashir County